This article lists the main modern pentathlon events and their results for 2018.

Youth Olympic Games
 October 11 – 16: Modern pentathlon at the 2018 Summer Youth Olympics
 Youth Individual winners:  Ahmed El-Gendy (m) /  Salma Abdelmaksoud (f)
 Youth Mixed Team Relay winners:  GU Yewen &  Ahmed El-Gendy

Other multi-sport events (Modern Pentathlon)
 June 6 – 8: 2018 ODESUR Modern Pentathlon Championships in  Cochabamba
 Individual winners:  Esteban Bustos (m) /  Iryna Khokhlova (f)
 Mixed Team Relay winners:  (Maria Guimarães Ieda Chaves & Victor Aguiar)
 Men's Team winners:  (Sergio Villamayor, Emmanuel Zapata, & Leandro Silva)
 Women's Team winners:  (Iryna Khokhlova, Ayelen Zapata, & Pamela Zapata)
 July 19 – 25: Modern pentathlon at the 2018 Central American and Caribbean Games
 Individual winners:  Charles Fernandez (m) /  Mayan Oliver (f)
 Team Relay winners:  (Lester Ders & Raidel Orama) (m) /  (Mayan Oliver & Tamara Vega) (f)
 Mixed Team Relay winners:  (Charles Fernandez & Sofia Cabrera)
 August 30 – September 2: Modern pentathlon at the 2018 Asian Games
 Individual winners:  Jun Woong-tae (m) /  ZHANG Mingyu (f)

World modern pentathlon championships
 April 7 – 16: 2018 World Youth "A" (U19) Modern Pentathlon Championships (Tetrathlon) in  Caldas da Rainha
 Youth Individual winners:  Ahmed El-Gendy (m) /  Alice Rinaudo (f)
 Youth Team Relay winners:  (MOON Ju-seong & LEE Min-seo) (m) /  (Alice Rinaudo & Maria Lea Lopez) (f)
 Youth Mixed Team Relay winners:  (Salma Abdelmaksoud & Ahmed El-Gendy)
 Youth Men's Team winners:  (Ahmed El-Gendy, Alyeldin Sewilam, & Mohanad Shaban)
 Youth Women's Team winners:  (Alice Rinaudo, Beatrice Mercuri, & Maria Lea Lopez)
 July 4 – 8: 2018 World University Modern Pentathlon Championships in  Budapest
 Individual winners:  Brice Loubet (m) /  Elena Micheli (f)
 Mixed Team Relay winners:  (Marta Kobecka & Lukasz Gutkowski)
 Team winners:  (Sherif Rashad, Sherif Nazeir, Haydy Morsy, & Ahmed El-Gendy)
 July 29 – August 6: 2018 World Junior Modern Pentathlon Championships in  Kladno
 Junior Individual winners:  Ahmed El-Gendy (m) /  Elena Micheli (f)
 Junior Team Relay winners:  (Marek Grycz & Martin Vlach) (m) /  (Sophia Hernandez & Sofia Cabrera) (f)
 Junior Mixed Team Relay winners:  (Kseniia Fraltsova & Serge Baranov)
 Junior Men's Team winners:  (Bence Kardos, Illés Szabó, & Balint Bernath)
 Junior Women's Team winners:  (Elena Micheli, Maria Lea Lopez, & Aurora Tognetti)
 September 6 – 15: 2018 World Modern Pentathlon Championships in  Mexico City
 Individual winners:  James Cooke (m) /  Anastasiya Prokopenko (f)
 Team Relay winners:  (Alexandre Henrard & Valentin Belaud) (m) /  (Anastasiya Prokopenko & Iryna Prasiantsova) (f)
 Mixed Team Relay winners:  (Fabian Liebig & Rebecca Langrehr)
 Men's Team winners:  (Valentin Prades, Valentin Belaud, & Brice Loubet)
 Women's Team winners:  (Sarolta Kovács, Zsófia Földházi, & Tamara Alekszejev)
 September 25 – 30: 2018 CISM World Modern Pentathlon Championships in  Budapest
 Individual winners:  Patrick Dogue (m) /  Ekaterina Khuraskina (f)
 Mixed Team Relay winners:  (ZHANG Linbin & WANG Wei)
 Men's Team winners:  (Alexandre Henrard, Valentin Belaud, & Christopher Patte)
 Women's Team winners:  (Ekaterina Khuraskina, Alise Fakhrutdinova, & Gulnaz Gubaydullina)

Contintental modern pentathlon championships
 May 24 – 27: 2018 Asia-Oceania U19 Modern Pentathlon Championships (Tetrathlon) in  Chonburi
 U19 Individual winners:  MOON Ju-seong (m) /  LEE Hwa-young (f)
 U19 Mixed Team Relay winners:  (LEE Hwa-young & MOON Ju-seong)
 U19 Men's Team winners:  (Temirlan Abdraimov, Eduard Gerber, & Adil Ibragimov)
 U19 Women's Team winners:  (Sofya Prizhennikova, Lyudmila Yakovleva, & Darya Kuzmina)
 June 10 – 18: 2018 European U19 Modern Pentathlon Championships (Tetrathlon) in  Drzonków
 U19 Individual winners:  Giorgio Malan (m) /  Anna Jurt (f)
 U19 Team Relay winners:  (Igor Powroznik & Kamil Kasperczak) (m) /  (Lilla Dallos & Anna Turbucz) (f)
 U19 Mixed Team Relay winners:  (Egor Gromadskii & Iuliia Sergeeva)
 U19 Men's Team winners:  (Csaba Bohm, József Tamas, & Bálint Katona)
 U19 Women's Team winners:  (Alice Rinaudo, Beatrice Mercuri, & Maria Lea Lopez)
 June 10 – 18: 2018 European U17 Modern Pentathlon Championships in  Drzonków
 U17 Individual winners:  Mihály Koleszár (m) /  Paulina Myrda (f)
 U17 Team Relay winners:  (Ivan Swhalupin & Ilya Gusev) (m) /  (Ewa Pydyszewska & Paulina Myrda) (f)
 U17 Mixed Team Relay winners:  (Maksim Fiadotka & Katsiaryna Etsina)
 U17 Men's Team winners:  (Mihály Koleszár, András Gáll, & Bence Szakaly)
 U17 Women's Team winners:  (Lili Basa, Melinda Zóra Deák, & Reka Marschall)
 June 15 – 18: 2018 Pan American U19 Modern Pentathlon Championships (Tetrathlon) in  San Antonio
 U19 Individual winners:  Alexis Vazquez (m) /  Catherine Mayran Oliver (f)
 U19 Men's Team winners:  (Alexis Vazquez, Lorenzo Macias, & Benjamín Gallegos)
 U19 Women's Team winners:  (Catherine Mayran Oliver, Melissa Mireles, & Itzel Rosales)
 June 17 – 23: 2018 European Junior Modern Pentathlon Championships in  El Prat de Llobregat
 Junior Individual winners:  Ivan Khamtsou (m) /  İlke Özyüksel (f)
 Junior Team Relay winners:  (Yauheni Arol & Ivan Khamtsou) (m) /  (Charlie Follett & Zoe Davison) (f)
 Junior Mixed Team Relay winners:  (Serge Baranov & Kseniia Fraltsova)
 Junior Men's Team winners:  (Serge Baranov, Andrei Zuev, & Sergey Kolbasenko)
 Junior Women's Team winners:  (Blanka Guzi, Michelle Gulyás, & Eszter Kalincsak)
 July 17 – 23: 2018 European Modern Pentathlon Championships in  Székesfehérvár
 Individual winners:  Valentin Prades (m) /  Marie Oteiza (f)
 Team Relay winners:  (Brice Loubet & Simon Casse) (m) /  (Iryna Prasiantsova & Volha Silkina) (f)
 Men's Team winners:  (Valentin Prades, Christopher Patte, & Valentin Belaud)
 Women's Team winners:  (Tamara Alekszejev, Sarolta Kovács, & Zsófia Földházi)
 September 18 – 23: 2018 European U24 Modern Pentathlon Championships in  Drzonków
 U24 Individual winners:  Łukasz Gutkowski (m) /  Ieva Serapinaitė (f)
 U24 Mixed Team Relay winners:  (Marta Kobecka & Łukasz Gutkowski)
 U24 Men's Team winners:  (Vladyslav Rydvanskyi, Oleksandr Pinchuk, & Oleksandr Tovkai)
 U24 Women's Team winners:  (Tatsiana Rahachova, Mikhalina Hrynkevich, & Viktoryia Astrouskaya)
 November 27 – December 2: 2018 Pan American Modern Pentathlon Championships in  Lima
 Individual winners:  Emmanuel Zapata (m) /  Leydi Moya (f)
 Team Relay winners:  (Felipe Nascimento & Danilo Fagundes) (m) /  (Leydi Moya & Eliani Cámara) (f)
 Mixed Team Relay winners:  (Jose Ricardo Figueroa & Leydi Moya)
 Men's Team winners:  (Emmanuel Zapata, Vicente Lima, & Leandro Silva)
 Women's Team winners:  (Mayan Oliver, Tamara Vega, & Priscila Espinoza)

2018 Modern Pentathlon World Cup
 February 28 – March 4: MPWC #1 in  Cairo
 Individual winners:  Christopher Patte (m) /  Élodie Clouvel (f)
 Mixed Team Relay winners:  (Gloria Tocchi & Gianluca Micozzi)
 March 27 – 31: MPWC #2 in  Los Angeles
 Individual winners:  LEE Ji-hun (m) /  Gulnaz Gubaydullina (f)
 Mixed Team Relay winners:  (Alessandra Frezza & Riccardo De Luca)
 May 3 – 7: MPWC #3 in  Kecskemét
 Individual winners:  Jun Woong-tae (m) /  Chloe Esposito (f)
 Mixed Team Relay winners:  (Bence Demeter & Sarolta Kovács)
 May 23 – 27: MPWC #4 in  Sofia
 Individual winners:  Arthur Lanigan-O'Keeffe (m) /  Kate French (f)
 Mixed Team Relay winners:  (Jan Kuf & Eliska Pribylova)
 June 21 – 24: MPWC #5 (final) in  Astana
 Individual winners:  Jung Jin-hwa (m) /  Chloe Esposito (f)
 Mixed Team Relay winners:  (Alice Sotero & Riccardo De Luca)

References

External links
 Union Internationale de Pentathlon Moderne Website (UIPM)

 
Modern pentathlon
2018 in sports
2018 sport-related lists